Łukasz Broź (born 17 December 1985 in Giżycko) is a Polish professional footballer who plays as a defender for Polish IV liga side Mazovia Mińsk Mazowiecki.

Career statistics

Club

1 All appearances in Ekstraklasa Cup.
2 All appearances in Polish Super Cup.

References

External links
 

1985 births
Living people
Polish footballers
Poland international footballers
Widzew Łódź players
Legia Warsaw players
Ekstraklasa players
I liga players
III liga players
People from Giżycko
Sportspeople from Warmian-Masurian Voivodeship
Association football defenders